Buffalo is an unincorporated community in Dawson County, Nebraska, United States.

History
A post office was established at Buffalo in 1896, and remained in operation until it was discontinued in 1957. Buffalo was named for the American bison (buffalo) which once roamed the area.

References

Unincorporated communities in Dawson County, Nebraska
Unincorporated communities in Nebraska